A senior center (or senior centre) is a type of community center where older adults congregate for fellowship with others to fulfill many of their social, physical, emotional, and intellectual needs. A regular part of senior centers is card and board games, along with video games as that generation moves into old age. Computer services and help, including computer labs and assistance with email, Internet access and tax preparation are also provided by many senior center programs.

Field trips to out-of-town events, venues, recreation, or other pursuits such as casino gambling, are often organized by local senior centers to allow their members to have fun outside their community.

Many centers also serve lunches, providing a critical community need to seniors who are still active and do not need Meals on Wheels service, but have limited financial means to make their own lunches, and prefer companionship while eating. 

In the United States, multiple cities and towns have senior centers which receive funding from private, municipal, state, and federal sources.

A senior center may often not go under that title, and often the facility also welcomes younger people, thus being known as a multigenerational center.

Activities
Activities vary by center and are based on the size of the center and funding.  Activities can include:

Dance room
Game Room
Computer lab
Craft room
Library
 Card room
 Meeting room
Horseshoe pits
Exercise room
Swimming pool
Lap pool

External links 
 Directory of Senior Centers based in the United States - OurSeniorCenter.com
 Center for Senior Health

Notes

Community centres